The following is a partial list of Arizona ballot propositions.

The initiative and referendum process in Arizona has been in use since Arizona attained statehood in 1912. The first initiative was passed the same year Arizona was granted statehood when on November 5, 1912, an initiative relating to women's suffrage was passed by a greater than two to one margin. The initiative process has long been a staple of Arizona politics, with 15 proposals appearing in the 1914 election, and recently in 2006 when voters were presented with 19.

Prior to 1976, ballot propositions were not assigned a measure number.  Since then, they have been identified by a 3-digit number.  Ballot propositions beginning with "1" are initiatives and referendums to amend the state constitution, those beginning with "2" are initiatives to amend state statutes, and those beginning with "3" are referendums on acts to amend state statutes.

2020s

2022

2020

2010s

2018

2016

2014

2012
114

115

116

117

118

119

120

121

204

2010

2000s

2008

2006
Shaded entries indicate citizen initiatives and referendums. Full text of each proposition is available here.

2004
Shaded entries indicate citizen initiatives and referendums.

2002
Shaded entries indicate citizen initiatives and referendums.

2000
Shaded entries indicate citizen initiatives and referendums.

1990s

1998

1996

1994
Shaded entries indicate citizen initiatives and referendums.

1992

1990
Shaded entries indicate citizen initiatives and referendums.

1912 to 1990

1988
Proposition 106, establishing English as the official state language passes by a narrow 50.5 to 49.5 margin.  Later overturned by the Arizona Supreme Court as unconstitutional in 1998.

The Arizona Constitution, Article XXVIII:
Section 2. The official language of the state of Arizona is English.
Section 3. A. Representatives of government in this state shall preserve, protect and
enhance the role of English as the official language of the government of Arizona.
Section 3. B. A person shall not be discriminated against or penalized in any way because the
person uses or attempts to use English in public or private communication.

Section 4. Official actions shall be conducted in English.

Section 5. Rules of construction, clarifies that The constitution does not "prohibit" other communication.
Section 1.notes the law does not apply to:
(a) The teaching of or the encouragement of learning languages other than English.
(b) Actions required under the federal individuals with disabilities education act or other
federal laws.
(c) Actions, documents or policies necessary for tourism, commerce or international
trade.
(d) Actions or documents that protect the public health and safety, including law
enforcement and emergency services.
(e) Actions that protect the rights of victims of crimes or criminal defendants.
(f) Using terms of art or phrases from languages other than English.
(g) Using or preserving Native American languages.
(h) Providing assistance to hearing impaired or illiterate persons.
(i) Informal and nonbinding translations or communications among or between
representatives of government and other persons if this activity does not affect or impair
supervision, management, conduct or execution of official actions and if the
representatives of government make clear that these translations or communications are
unofficial and are not binding on this state or a political subdivision of this state.
(j) Actions necessary to preserve the right to petition for the redress of grievances.

1980
Proposition 200, providing for a state lottery passes by a narrow 51 to 49 margin.  Lottery History

1968
Proposition 104, changed the term of office for Governor, Secretary of State, State Treasurer, Attorney General, and Superintendent of Public Instruction from two years to four effective with the terms beginning in January 1971.

1946
Dual initiatives establishing Arizona as a Right-to-work state pass.

1916
Initiative to abolish the death penalty passes.  A similar initiative failed in 1914.  Repealed by another initiative in 1918.

1914
Constitutional amendment protecting citizen initiative from veto power as well as exempting them from repeal by the state legislature.

1912
Initiative to grant universal suffrage to women passes by a 2 to 1 margin.  Arizona's first ballot measure.

See also 
 Timeline of women's suffrage in Arizona
 Women's suffrage in Arizona

References

 

 
Ballot propositions
Arizona